
This is a list of aircraft in numerical order of manufacturer followed by alphabetical order beginning with 'M'.

Mf

MFI 
(Malmö FlygIndustri)
 MFI-9 Junior
 MFI-10 Vipan
 MFI BA-12 Sländan
 MFI-15

MFP 
(M F P Steel Constructed Aeroplanes, New York, NY)
 MFP 1916 Biplane

References

Further reading

External links 

 List of Aircraft (M)

fr:Liste des aéronefs (I-M)